Knoxville is a city in Knox County, Illinois, United States. The population was 2,911 at the 2010 census. It is part of the Galesburg Micropolitan Statistical Area.

Description

Knoxville is located just southeast of the City of Galesburg. There is a public square in the center of town with several historic buildings surrounding it including Knox County's first courthouse, city hall, the Ball log cabin, the town gallows, and several other important buildings. The Knox County Fairgrounds is just north of Knoxville on Henderson Road. Knoxville is served with two exits on Interstate 74, at U.S. Highway 150 east of town and at Henderson Road north of town. U.S. Highway 150 runs east and west through Knoxville and serves as the main business thoroughfare. Illinois Highway 97 and Knox County Highway 8 also enter the city. The Knoxville Cemetery lies in the northern part of town on Market Street. The Knox County Nursing Home is located in the city. There is a grade school in Knoxville, as well as a Junior High and a High School (KHS). Among the "attractions" in Knoxville are the historic buildings, Walnut Grove Farm and Rattle Toes exhibit, the Knox County Fair held in August, and the annual Knox County Scenic Drive held in October.

History

Knoxville was established on January 15, 1831, and called Henderson until its name was changed to Knoxville on December 22, 1832 when it became the county seat. It was one of the first 10 municipalities incorporated in the state and is the oldest town in Knox County. James Knox was a notable early resident.

Knoxville was the county seat until 1873, when the county seat was moved to Galesburg. The first Knox County Courthouse, completed in 1839, and second Knox County jail, completed in 1845, still stand in Knoxville and are registered on the National Register of Historic Places. The two buildings and Knoxville's first general store, the Sanburn Log Cabin, built in 1832, have been restored and are open to the public. The county's Hall of Records, built in 1854, is used as Knoxville's City Hall.

The log cabin of John G. Sanburn was not discovered until decades after his death, when it was nearly destroyed. In 1832, Sanburn settled in Knoxville to open the first shop, which also served as the first post office. He was the first county clerk, circuit clerk, Indian master, and probate judge, as well as shopkeeper and postmaster. Years later, as the house built around Sanburn's cabin was being demolished, a nosey neighbor spied the underlying log structure and alerted the authorities. At that time the owner of the property, Bernice LaFollette, donated the cabin to the city as a museum.

Typical log cabins like Sanburn's measured about 14' x 14' wide and 7'-8' high with 9" walnut lincoln logs, wooden door hinges, and clapboard shingles. The entire area of Sanburn's cabin and general store served as a kitchen while encased in Johnson's home. A restoration in 1964 insured proper security and insulation that Sanburn did not enjoy in the 1830s, including glass windows and cement sealant to replace clay and hay between logs.

The cabin contains general store memorabilia for display and a picture of an 1852 penny discovered in the foundation when the house was moved from the south to the north side of the square for restoration. The John G Sanburn Log Cabin is maintained by the Knox County Historic Sites. It is open for public view during the first two weekends in October for the Knox County Scenic Drive and from 2-4 p.m. Sundays, May–September.

The Old Knox County Jail was the location of the only legal hanging in Knox County when John Osborne was hanged March 14, 1873, for the murder and sodomy of Adelia M. Mathews, Yates City.

Abraham Lincoln stayed in Knoxville on his way to his debate with Stephen A. Douglas at Knox College in 1858. The hotel that he spent the night in was demolished but a plaque on the building currently at the site commemorates the occasion.

Geography
Knoxville is located at  (40.907526, -90.282691).

Climate

Demographics

As of the census of 2000, there were 3,183 people, 1,210 households, and 878 families residing in the city. The racial makeup of the city was 98.59% White, 0.35% African American, 0.13% Native American, 0.06% Asian, 0.13% from other races, and 0.75% from two or more races. Hispanic or Latino of any race were 0.57% of the population. 
There were 1,210 households, out of which 33.2% had children under the age of 18 living with them, 57.5% were married couples living together, 12.0% had a female householder with no husband present, and 27.4% were non-families. 24.4% of all households were made up of individuals, and 13.2% had someone living alone who was 65 years of age or older. The average household size was 2.45 and the average family size was 2.89.

In the city, the population was spread out, with 23.7% under the age of 18, 6.8% from 18 to 24, 24.0% from 25 to 44, 23.4% from 45 to 64, and 22.2% who were 65 years of age or older. The median age was 42 years. For every 100 females, there were 85.7 males. For every 100 females age 18 and over, there were 79.9 males.

The median income for a household in the city was $43,438, and the median income for a family was $49,688. Males had a median income of $31,442 versus $23,939 for females. The per capita income for the city was $18,643. About 1.9% of families and 3.1% of the population were below the poverty line, including 3.7% of those under age 18 and 0.8% of those age 65 or over.

Notable people 

 Robert H. "Three-Inch" Birch, a member of the "Banditti of the Prairie," accomplice in the 1845 torture-murder of Colonel George Davenport
 Charles C. Craig, jurist and politician
 Justina Ford, physician
 Armando Ghitalla, trumpet player with the Boston Symphony and Boston Pops
 Justin Hartley, actor known for roles on Passions, Smallville, and This Is Us
 James Knox, congressman
 Charles Wesley Leffingwell Episcopal priest, writer, and educator
 Ernest de Koven Leffingwell, explorer
 John E. Raker, politician
 James Knox Taylor, architect
 Charles R. Walgreen, founder of Walgreens
Matt Wilson, world renowned jazz drummer
 Polly Wolfe, Major League Baseball outfielder

References

External links
City of Knoxville
Knox County Historical Sites Inc.

Cities in Illinois
Cities in Knox County, Illinois
Galesburg, Illinois micropolitan area
Populated places established in 1831